Kavalu  is a 2010 Kannada novel by one of the eminent novelists S.L. Bhyrappa. Kavalu means "cross-roads"  and the novel deals with Indian society at Crossroads in the era of globalization. The story revolves around the main character Jaya Kumar.

Book was released on 28 June 2010 and 3700 copies were sold out in first three days. Post its release numerous debates were conducted by author himself notably at Bangalore and Hubballi. The book was in the Top-10 list.

Characters 

 Jai Kumar
 Vaijayanthi Jai Kumar
 Vatsala (Puttakka/Jai Kumar and Vaijayanthi's daughter)
 Dyaavakka (Vaijayanthi Jai Kumar's House maid)
 Mangala Jai Kumar
 Prabhakara (Mangala's Collegemate and Paramour )
 Nachiket (Software Engineer and nephew of Jai Kumar)
 Rajamma (Jai Kumar's mother)
 Shobha Naraayan (Nachiket's mother and Jaikumar's Sister)
 Narayan (Jai Kumar's brother-in-law)
 Keshava (Jai Kumar's Elder Brother)
 Chitra Hosur
 Maala Kerur
 Ila (English Professor )
 Sujaya (Sweety/Ila and Vinaychandra's daughter)
 Vinay Chandra (Ila's former husband)
 Minister (Ila's boyfriend)

Reprints

 First print: 2010
 Second print: 2010
 Third print: 2010
 Fourth print: 2010
 Fifth print: 2010
 Sixth print: 2010
 Seventh print: 2010
 Eighth print : 2010
 Ninth print : 2010
 Tenth print : 2010
 Eleventh print : 2010
 Twelfth print: 2010
 Thirteenth print: 2010
 Fourteenth print:2010
 Fifteenth print: 2010
 Sixteenth print: 2011
 Seventeenth print: 2011

Debate on Kavalu 
ವಿಚಾರಗೋಷ್ಠಿ - Debate on kavalu: 
 Bangalore
 Hubballi

Footnotes

References
 http://slbhyrappa.com/
 About books release and the sales details: http://kannada.oneindia.in/news/2010/06/30/sl-bhyrappa-new-novel-kavalu-sold-out.html
 Top ten books as mentioned in Website: http://kannada.oneindia.in/ 
 kavalu review : 

Kannada novels
2010 Indian novels
Novels by S. L. Bhyrappa